Dido Elizabeth Belle (June 1761 – July 1804) was a British heiress and a member of the Lindsay family of Evelix. She was born into slavery and illegitimate; her mother, Maria Belle, was an enslaved Black woman in the British West Indies. Her father was Sir John Lindsay, a British career naval officer who was stationed there. Her father was knighted and promoted to admiral. Lindsay took Belle with him when he returned to England in 1765, entrusting her upbringing to his uncle William Murray, 1st Earl of Mansfield, and his wife Elizabeth Murray, Countess of Mansfield. The Murrays educated Belle, bringing her up as a free gentlewoman at their Kenwood House, together with another great-niece, Lady Elizabeth Murray, whose mother had died. Lady Elizabeth and Belle were second cousins. Belle lived there for 30 years. In his will of 1793, Lord Mansfield provided an outright sum and an annuity to her, making her an heiress.

Early life

Dido Elizabeth Belle was born into slavery in 1761 in the British West Indies to an enslaved African woman known as Maria Belle. (Her name was spelled as Maria Bell in her daughter's baptism record.) Her father was 24-year-old Sir John Lindsay, a member of the Lindsay family of Evelix branch of the Clan Lindsay and a descendant of the Clan Murray, who was a career naval officer and then captain of the British warship HMS Trent, based in the West Indies. He was the son of Sir Alexander Lindsay, 3rd Baronet and his wife Amelia, daughter of David Murray, 5th Viscount Stormont. Lindsay is thought to have found Maria Belle held as a slave on a Spanish ship which his forces captured in the Caribbean. Lindsay returned to London after the war in 1765 with his young daughter, Dido Belle. When they arrived in England he took her to Kenwood House just outside the city, the home of his uncle, William Murray, 1st Earl of Mansfield, and his wife Elizabeth Murray, Countess of Mansfield. Belle was baptised as Dido Elizabeth Belle in 1766 at St George's, Bloomsbury. The Murray family raised Belle as an educated woman along with their niece and Dido's cousin, Lady Elizabeth Murray, whose mother had died.

A contemporary obituary of Sir John Lindsay, who had eventually been promoted to admiral, acknowledged that he was the father of Dido Belle, and described her: "[H]e has died, we believe, without any legitimate issue but has left one natural daughter, a Mulatta who has been brought up in Lord Mansfield's family almost from her infancy and whose amiable disposition and accomplishments have gained her the highest respect from all his Lordship's relations and visitants." At one time, historians thought her mother was an African slave on a ship captured by Lindsay's warship during the Siege of Havana, but this specific date is unlikely, as Dido was born in 1761.

At Kenwood House

The Earl and Countess of Mansfield lived at Kenwood House in Hampstead, just outside the City of London. Childless, they were already raising their motherless great-niece, Lady Elizabeth Murray, born in 1760. It is possible that the Mansfields took Belle in to be Lady Elizabeth's playmate and, later in life, her personal attendant. Her role within the family suggests that she became more that of a lady's companion than a lady's maid.

At Kenwood House, "Belle was treated like the rest of the family when she was in company with only the family," says Mansfield. Dido Elizabeth Belle worked as an amanuensis for Lord Mansfield in his later years.

Belle lived at Kenwood House for 31 years. Her position was unusual because she had been born into slavery according to colonial law. Lord and Lady Mansfield to some extent treated her and brought her up as a member of the Murray family. As she grew older, she often assisted Mansfield by taking dictation of his letters, which showed she had been educated.

One of Mansfield's friends, American Thomas Hutchinson, a former governor of Massachusetts who as a Loyalist had moved to London, recalled in his personal diary that Belle "was called upon by my Lord every minute for this thing and that, and showed the greatest attention to everything he said". He described her as "neither handsome nor genteel – pert enough". He also talked about his first impressions of her at Lord Mansfield's house, saying "A Black came in after dinner and sat with the ladies, and after coffee, walked with the company in the gardens, one of the young ladies having her arm within the other. She had a very high cap, and her wool was much frizzled in her neck, but not enough to answer the large curls now in fashion. I knew her history before, but my Lord mentioned it again. Sir Lindsay, having taken her mother prisoner in a Spanish vessel, brought her to England, where she delivered of this girl, of which she was then with child, and which was taken care of by Lord M., and has been educated by his family. He calls her Dido, which I suppose is all the name she has. He knows he has been reproached for showing a fondness for her – I dare say not criminal". From Lord Mansfield's statement to Hutchinson, Lord Mansfield seemed to have disguised the fact that Dido was his own great niece from the Governor, hence created an implication that Hutchinson thought she was Mansfield’s mistress. Such a relationship would have been common in the West Indies as his diary implied "I dare say not criminal"

A brief reference to Belle occurs in volume II of James Beattie's Elements of Moral Science. Beattie refers to her intelligence, saying "But I happened, a few days after, to see his theory overturned, and my conjecture established by a negro girl about ten years old, who had been six years in England, and not only spoke with the articulation and accent of a native, but repeated some pieces of poetry, with a degree of elegance, which would have been admired in any English child of her years." Following this is a footnote which states, "She was in Lord Mansfield's family; and at his desire, and in his presence, repeated those pieces of poetry to me. She was called Dido, and I believe is still alive." This and the quotations from Thomas Hutchinson are some of the few direct references to Dido found in primary source material.

Lord Mansfield ruled on a related matter of the status of slaves in England in his capacity as Lord Chief Justice of England and Wales. When called on in 1772 to judge Somerset v Stewart, the case of an escaped slave whose owner wanted to send him back to the West Indies for sale, he decreed: 

Mansfield's ruling that slavery did not exist in common law and had never been introduced by positive law was taken by abolitionists to mean that slavery was abolished in England. Mansfield later said his decision was intended only to apply to the slave at issue in the case. At the time, it was suggested that Mansfield's personal experience with raising Dido Belle influenced his decision. Thomas Hutchinson later recalled a comment by a slave-owner: "A few years ago there was a cause before his Lordship brought by a Black for recovery of his liberty. A Jamaica planter, being asked what judgment his Lordship would give [answered] 'No doubt... he will be set free, for Lord Mansfield keeps a Black in his house which governs him and the whole family.'"

Social position
The notion of a mixed-race child born in this era to be raised as part of an aristocratic British family was virtually unheard of, and the social conventions of Mansfield's household are somewhat unclear. A 2007 exhibit at Kenwood suggests that Dido's African origins may have played a part in the disparity, yet it was also usual to treat illegitimate children as lesser family, therefore she wasn't permitted to dine in with guests, as was reported by Thomas Hutchinson. He said Belle joined the ladies afterwards for coffee in the drawing-room. In 2014, author Paula Byrne wrote that Belle's exclusion from this particular dinner was pragmatic rather than the custom. She notes that other aspects of Belle's life, such as being given expensive medical treatments and luxurious bedroom furnishings, were evidence of her position as Lady Elizabeth's equal at Kenwood.

As Belle grew older, she took on the responsibility of managing the dairy and poultry yards at Kenwood. This was a typical occupation for ladies of the gentry, but helping her uncle with his correspondence was less usual. This was normally done by a male secretary or a clerk. Thomas Hutchinson also remarked on Dido's position "She is a sort of Superintendent over the dairy, poultry yard, &c., which we visited, and she was called upon by my Lord every minute for this thing and that, and shewed the greatest attention to everything he said." 

Belle was also given an annual allowance of £20, additional of £10 for Birthday and Christmas. By contrast, Lady Elizabeth received £100, not including birthday and other gifts, as the only surviving account book started just as Lady Elizabeth was leaving to be married, but Lady Elizabeth was an heiress in her own right through her mother's aristocratic family. Belle, quite apart from her race, was illegitimate, in a time and place when great social stigma usually accompanied such status. Dido's allowance was also given quarterly which means she would have received £5 every 3 months, while Lady Elizabeth received £50 every 6 months, this would had further limited Dido's purchasing power compared to Elizabeth's at any given time. 

For comparison: The annual wage of a female domestic worker holding the position of a housekeeper in a high-status household ranged from £20 to £70 at that time, while a Royal Navy lieutenant would draw about £100 a year. About £200 purchased a 3-bedroom house with garden outside the city of London.

In Lord Mansfield's will written and directed by himself, Mansfield does not refer to Dido as his niece, unlike how Mansfield referred Lady Elizabeth, Lady Anne, and Lady Marjory Murray as all his nieces.

Mary Hamilton's Letters 
Mary Hamilton (1756-1816), courtier and diarist, was Lady Stormont's first cousin, Lady Stormont was Lady Elizabeth's stepmother. In 1777, Hamilton was asked by Queen Charlotte to help with the young prince and princesses. Hamilton had been wanting to retire from court because of the exhausting demand as courtier, Hamilton was finally permitted by Queen Charlotte to retire from court in 1782, she was also part of Blue Stockings Society

In spring 1784, The Prince of Wales (who previously had a crush on Mary) begged Mary Hamilton’s uncle to invite her to attend a royal ball to which Lady Stormont was also invited, she reluctantly accepted. On the day of the Ball, Mary Hamilton wrote in her diary that her cousin Lady Stormont had invited her stepdaughter Lady Elizabeth to the Prince’s royal ball at Carlton house, and she was present when Lady Stormont picked up Hamilton on the way to the ball in her carriage. Although Lady Elizabeth was invited, Dido was quite evidently not invited to the royal ball.

Throughout Mary Hamilton’s diary, she never once mentioned Dido Belle, despite her numerous visit to Kenwood House, in which she had described all member of the Murray family including Lady Elizabeth, Lady Elizabeth's 3 half sibling, 2 unmarried aunts, old Lord Mansfield, and even the Parish Priest. This might indicate that she never saw Dido during her multiple visits to Kenwood and when she brushed upon the entire Murray clan at the church.Autumn of 1784 "Lord Stormont & I set out in her Post- chaise for Highgate -- it was but a dull Rainy Morning Lord Stormont gave me a good deal of information respecting a sejour at Rome & Naples.........in 40 minutes -- it was a considerable time before the Service began -- but we found Lord Stormont's 2 Sisters & his Daughter & Master Murray ready in the Pew to receive us.......Lord Stormonts eldest Sister, his Daughter, Master Murray & myself went in the Coach. Lord Stormont & Miss May(Marjory) Murray in the Chaise we drove to Ken Wood which is a Mile from Highgate Church -- we pass'd Lord Southamptons Farm. when we got to Lord Mansfields House Lord Stormont & Miss Murrays carried me all over it to show the Rooms &c. it is a large & House -- there is one fine room -- an Oval form of 60 feet long"From Mary Hamilton's diary, it seemed that Dido didn't join the family or Lady Elizabeth to the nearby church and she was again absent when Mary Hamilton was given tour of Kenwood House by Lady Elizabeth, Dido also seemed to be further excluded from the many family outings that was attended by Mary Hamilton, which seems to consolidate Dido's awkward position in the household.

Later life
Lady Mansfield died on 10 April 1784 after long illness, thus Elizabeth's 2 aunts Lady Anne and Lady Marjory took charge of the household accounts.

On 15 December 1785, Lady Elizabeth Married George Finch Hatton, a rich aristocratic gentlemen, Heir to Earl of Winchilsea and Earl Nottingham upon his unmarried cousin's death, he was also Lady Mansfield's nephew. Elizabeth, Belle's childhood companion would left Kenwood at the age of 25 and began her married life between her husband's 2 vast estates Kirby Hall and Eastwell Park.

Belle's father died in 1788 without legitimate heirs, bequeathing £1000 to be shared by his "reputed children", John and Elizabeth Lindsay (as noted in his will) and nothing for Dido. Overwhelming sources said that the Elizabeth named in his will was his other illegitimate daughter called Elizabeth Palmer (born c. 1765), who lived in Scotland. Elizabeth Palmer and her half brother John was known to keep in contact.

Belle's legal status while Lord Mansfield was alive is uncertain. In his will written in 1783, published in 1793, Lord Mansfield officially confirmed or conferred Belle's freedom. To secure her future after his death, he bequeathed to her £500 as an outright sum and a £100 annuity. In 1799, Belle also inherited £100 from Lady Margery Murray, one of two female relatives who had come to live with and help care for the Murrays in their later years.

However, Lord Mansfield left his niece Lady Elizabeth Murray £10,000. Her father was in line to inherit his uncle's title and entire wealth.

Initially in the original 1782 will of Lord Mansfield, he only intended Dido to receive the 100 pound annuity, but then decided to add the lump sum of 200 pound and later another 300 pound resulting in total 500 pound, Lady Elizabeth was always intended to receive 10 thousand pound, he also added to Lady Elizabeth's 2 aunts's inheritance immensely resulting in 22 thousand pound and 1000 pound annuity for their life, it is also worth noting that Lord Mansfield was well aware as judge that Lady Elizabeth would eventually inherited the wealth of her 2 aunts.

After Lord Mansfield's death in March 1793, Belle married Jean Louis Charles Davinière (anglicized to John Davinier) on 5 December 1793 at St George's, Hanover Square. Belle's husband was a French servant from Ducey in the Normandy. His date of birth is unknown, but he was baptised on 16 November 1768; assuming this happened shortly after birth, he was seven years younger than his wife. He had left France for England towards the end of the 1780s and found work as servant or valet with John ('Fish') Craufurd. They were both then residents of the parish. The Daviniers had at least three sons: twins Charles and John, both baptised at St George's on 8 May 1795; and William Thomas, baptised there on 26 January 1802.

Belle died in 1805 at the age of 43, and was interred in July of that year at St George's Fields, Westminster, a burial ground close to what is now Bayswater Road. In the 1970s, the site was redeveloped and her grave was moved. Her husband later remarried and had two more children with his second wife.

Descendants

Two of Belle's sons, William Thomas and Charles, were employed by the East India Company; William in England and Charles in India. Presumably, both of them had enjoyed a good private school education in their childhood, with tuition in English, Greek, Latin, French, accounting, land surveying, mathematics and drawing.

Charles Davinière joined the army in 1811 and initially served as ensign with the Madras Army (one of the territorial armies of the East India Company (HEIC), preceding the British Indian Army). He was assigned to the 15th Madras Native Infantry (MNI) and later to the 30th MNI (that was formed from the 2nd Battailon, 15th MNI, in 1824). He was promoted to lieutenant in 1817 and captain in 1827. In August 1837, he was "to have charge of Infantry recruits" in the headquarters at Fort St. George. Becoming major in 1841, Davinière retired on health grounds in 1845 or 1847, still serving then with the 30th MNI. Nonetheless, he was promoted one more time, to lieutenant colonel of the Madras Infantry, in 1855. The reason seems unclear; possibly he was reactivated for an unknown number of years.

Charles Davinière had married Hannah Nash, youngest daughter of J. Nash, Esquire of Kensington, at Kensington Church in August 1836. After his (final) retirement, Charles lived with his wife, children, and servants at Lansdowne Villas in Notting Hill, where he died on 24 January 1873.

William Thomas Davinière married a widow, Fanny Graham, and had a daughter, Emily. Emily died unmarried in 1870, several years after the death of her parents.

Belle's last known descendant, her great-great-grandson Harold Davinier, died childless in South Africa in 1975.

Representation in media

18th-century portrait painting
The family commissioned a painting of Dido and Elizabeth. Completed in 1779, it was formerly attributed to Johann Zoffany but, following research by the BBC TV programme Fake or Fortune?, it has now been verified by the Scottish National Gallery as a painting in the Zoffany style by the Scottish portraitist David Martin. It is "unique in British art of the 18th century in depicting a black woman and a white woman as near equals". It shows Dido alongside and slightly behind her cousin Elizabeth, carrying exotic fruit and wearing a turban with a large ostrich feather. The painting is owned by the present Earl of Mansfield and housed at Scone Palace in Perth, Scotland. In 2007, it was exhibited in Kenwood House, together with more information about Belle, during an exhibition marking the bicentenary of the Abolition of the Slave Trade Act 1807.

English Heritage discusses the painting; "The portrait of the two women is highly unusual in 18th-century British art for showing a black woman as the equal of her white companion, rather than as a servant or slave. [] The basket of tropical fruit she carries and the turban with expensive feather that she wears suggest an exotic difference from her more conventionally styled white cousin, who is sitting reading a book. "

Film, music, plays
Dido Belle (2006), a film by Jason Young, was written as a short period drama titled Kenwood House. It was workshopped at Battersea Arts Centre on 21 June 2006 as part of the Battersea Writers' Group script development programme.
Shirley J. Thompson's operatic trilogy, Spirit Songs – including Spirit of the Middle Passage about Dido Elizabeth Belle, with Abigail Kelly in the role – was performed with the Philharmonia Orchestra at London's Queen Elizabeth Hall, Southbank Centre, in March 2007 as part of the 200-year commemoration of the act abolishing the Atlantic slave trade.
An African Cargo by Margaret Busby, a play staged by Black Theatre Co-operative (now NitroBeat) featuring actor Jeffery Kissoon at Greenwich Theatre, 2007, in commemoration of the bicentenary of the Abolition of the Slave Trade Act, deals with a landmark 1783 trial presided over by Lord Mansfield at the Guildhall, resulting from the Zong massacre. The character of Dido Belle expresses to the audience feelings of horror and injustice for the murder of the slaves on the ship.
Let Justice Be Done by Suchitra Chatterjee and Maureen Hicks, a play put on by the Mixed Blessings Theatre Group was premiered at the 2008 Brighton Fringe and explored the influence that Dido Belle might have had on her great-uncle's Somersett Ruling of 1772.
Belle (2013), a feature film directed by Amma Asante, explores Dido's life as the multiracial natural daughter of an aristocrat in 18th-century England, who became an heiress but occupied an ambiguous social position. The film is based on the 1779 painting of Dido and her cousin Elizabeth. The film stars Gugu Mbatha-Raw as Dido and Tom Wilkinson as her guardian Lord Mansfield.
Fern Meets Dido (2018), A musical written by Evadne Bygrave based on the book Fern and Kate Meet Dido Elizabeth Belle by David Gleave. The story of a modern-day young girl of mixed heritage, disaffected at school and uncertain about her identity. On a school trip to Kenwood House, something magical happens, and she goes back in time and meets Dido.
I, Dido (2018), a three-handed play by Non Vaughan-O'Hagan was commissioned by St George's Bloomsbury where Dido was baptised. The play explores the relationship between Dido, Lord Mansfield and Lady Betty. Act I takes place on the night of 6 June 1780 when the Mansfields' home in Bloomsbury Square was destroyed in the Gordon Riots . Act II takes place in Kenwood House six years later, after the death of Lady Betty. The play has also been adapted as a short film of the same name, directed by Penelope Shales-Slyne.

Novels
 Family Likeness, a 2013 novel by Caitlin Davies, was inspired in part by the life of Dido Elizabeth Belle.
 Author Paula Byrne was commissioned to write Belle: The True Story of Dido Belle (2014) as a tie-in to the 2013 film Belle. It was published in paperback and as an audiobook when the movie opened in the United States.
 Zadie Smith mentions the story of Belle in her 2016 novel Swing Time when the narrator goes to Kenwood House and overhears a tour guide talking about her.
 The short-story collection The Woman Who Gave Birth to Rabbits, by Emma Donoghue, contains a short story called "Dido", about Dido Elizabeth Belle.
 Dido Elizabeth Belle features as one of the two central characters in The Lizzie and Belle Mysteries: Drama and Danger by children's author J.T. Williams, published in 2022. This is the first of series of historical novels set in eighteenth century London, anchored around the imagined friendship of Dido Belle with Elizabeth "Lizzie" Sancho, daughter of Ignatius Sancho.

References

External links
 Slavery And Justice: Lord Mansfield And Dido Belle At Kenwood, Untold London, 2007
 Slavery and Justice exhibition at Kenwood House, on Mansfield and Dido.
 Historic England leaflet, Slavery and Justice: the legacies of Dido Belle and Lord Mansfield, Part 1, Part 2
 Paula Byrne, Belle: The True Story of Dido Belle, Harper Collins, 2014. 
 "Inside Out: Abolition of the British Slave Trade special", BBC London, 24 September 2014
 Article on discovering Dido, in Hampstead Matters, February 2014

1761 births
1804 deaths
Black British former slaves
Black British history
British socialites
Clan Murray
British Anglicans
Black British women
English people of Scottish descent
English people of West Indian descent
Lindsay family of Evelix
People from the British West Indies
18th-century English women
19th-century English women
18th-century slaves